Mirza Agha Aliyev (1883 in Hövsan (Baku) – October 25, 1954 in Baku) was an Azerbaijani actor. People's Artist of the USSR (1949). The winner of two Stalin Prizes of the second degree (1943, 1948).

Biography
Born to a rural family, Mirza Agha received his first education at a Muslim religious school, and later completed a Russian-Muslim school in Baku. His career was deeply influenced by Azerbaijani theatrical figures, Najaf bey Vezirov and Jahangir Zeynalov, and his first role was that of Shahmar bey in "Musibeti Fakhraddin" by N. Vezirov.

In 1906-1907, M. A. Aliyev headed the "Hamiyyat" theatrical group, which made shows mostly in industrial districts. In 1912, for his revolutionary activity, he was exiled to Astrakhan by the Tsarist authorities. In 1912-1916, he made several shows in cities along Volga River, Tiflis, Erivan, and various towns in Iran and Turkey. His most classical role was the character of Isgandar in "The Dead Men" ("Ölülər") satirical comedy by Jalil Mammadguluzade, performed in Baku in 1916.

After the Sovietization of Azerbaijan, M. A. Aliyev organized the "Free Critical and Promotional Theatre" in Baku, and from 1924 till the end of his life worked at the Azerbaijani State Dramatical Theatre. Aliyev was also known as a cinema actor, and played in "In the name of God" ("Bismillah"), "Haji Qara", "The Game of Love" ("Məhəbbət Oyunu"), "The Diamond" ("Almaz"), "The Lights of Baku" ("Bakının İşıqları") and several other films.

Personal life
He was briefly married to actress Govhar Gaziyeva.

See also
 List of People's Artists of the Azerbaijan SSR

References

External links

1883 births
1954 deaths
20th-century Azerbaijani male actors
Actors from Baku
Communist Party of the Soviet Union members
People's Artists of the Azerbaijan SSR
People's Artists of the USSR
Stalin Prize winners
Recipients of the Order of the Red Banner of Labour
Azerbaijani male film actors
Azerbaijani male stage actors
Soviet Azerbaijani people
Soviet male actors